This is a list of African poets. Contemporary Africa has a range of important poets across many different genres and cultures. Poetry in Africa details more on the history and context of contemporary poetry on the continent.

A
 Chris Abani, Nigeria
 Maria do Carmo Abecassis, Mozambique
 Mohammed Abed Elhai, Sudan
 Lionel Abrahams, South Africa
 Henrique Abranches, Angola
 P. A. K. Aboagye, Ghana
 Mohammed Achaari, Morocco
 Chinua Achebe, Nigeria
 Catherine Obianuju Acholonu, Nigeria
 Elhadi Adam, Sudan
 Adamou Idé, Niger
 Tatamkulu Afrika, South Africa
 Ama Ata Aidoo, Ghana
 Funso Aiyejina, Nigeria
 Grace Akello, Uganda
 Mohammed ibn Mohammed Alami, Morocco
 Mohammed ibn Idris al-Amrawi, Morocco
 Kaddour El Alamy, Morocco
 Abu Salim al-Ayyashi, Morocco
 Sebastião Alba, Mozambique
 Mike Alfred, South Africa
 Amina Said Ali, Somalia
 AlKabli, Sudan
 Akilu Aliyu, Nigeria
 Al-Saddiq Al-Raddi, Sudan
 Abdulkareem Baba Aminu, Nigeria
 Jean Amrouche, Algeria
 Ingrid Andersen, South Africa
 Tyrone Appollis, South Africa
 Eseohe Arhebamen (a.k.a. Edoheart), Nigeria
 Khadambi Asalache, Kenya
 Nana Asma’u, Nigeria
 Hennie Aucamp, South Africa
 Mohammed Awzal, Morocco
 Ayo Ayoola-Amale, Nigeria
 Ali Azaykou, Morocco
 Étienne Azéma, Réunion
 Jean-Henri Azéma, Réunion
 Nnorom Azuonye, Nigeria

B

 Ali Birra, Ethiopia
 J. Benibengor Blay, Ghana
 Kwesi Brew, Ghana
 Angèle Bassolé-Ouédraogo, Côte d'Ivoire
 Tanella Boni, Côte d'Ivoire
 Ali Bu'ul, Somaliland
 Mohammed Ben Brahim, Morocco
 Siham Benchekroun, Morocco
 Abdelmajid Benjelloun, Morocco
 Hafsa Bikri, Morocco
 Al-Buzidi al-Bujrafi, Morocco
 Philip Begho, Nigeria
 Alioune Badara Bèye, Senegal
 Gabeba Baderoon, South Africa
 Shabbir Banoobhai, South Africa
 Sinclair Beiles, South Africa
 Robert Berold, South Africa
 Vonani Bila, South Africa
 Peter Blum, South Africa
 Roy Blumenthal, South Africa
 Breyten Breytenbach, South Africa
 Dennis Brutus, South Africa
 Guy Butler, South Africa
 Mildred Barya, Uganda

C
 Robert Calvert, South Africa
 Roy Campbell, South Africa
 Jan F. E. Celliers, South Africa
 Steve Chimombo, Mali
 Chirikure Chirikure, Zimbabwe
 Yvette Christiansë, South Africa
 Charl Cilliers, South Africa
 J. P. Clark Nigeria
 Jack Cope, South Africa
 José Craveirinha, Mozambique
 Jeremy Cronin, South Africa
 Patrick Cullinan, South Africa
 Gary Cummiskey, South Africa
 Sheila Cussons, South Africa
 Chijioke Amu-Nnadi, Nigeria

D

 Mohammed Dib, Algeria
 Tahar Djaout, Algeria
 Viriato da Cruz, Angola
 Bernadette Sanou Dao, Burkina Faso
 Mbella Sonne Dipoko, Cameroon
 Kwame Dawes, Ghana
 Bernard Binlin Dadié, Côte d'Ivoire
 Fily Dabo Sissoko, Mali
 Souéloum Diagho, Mali
 David Diop, Senegal
 Achmat Dangor, South Africa
 Johann de Lange, South Africa
 Dertigers, South Africa
 Phillippa Yaa de Villiers, South Africa
 Isobel Dixon, South Africa
 Angifi Dladla, South Africa
 Donovan Mitchell, South Africa
 Finuala Dowling, South Africa

E

 Michael Echeruo, Nigeria
 Amatoritsero Ede, Nigeria
 Elisabeth Eybers, South Africa
 Bushra Elfadil, Sudan
 Mohammed Moftahh Elfitory, Sudan
 John Eppel, Zimbabwe

F

 Achour Fenni, Algeria
 Allal al-Fassi, Morocco
 Abd al-Rahman al-Fazazi, Morocco
 Fadhy Mtanga, Tanzania 
 Femi Fani-Kayode, Nigeria
 Sheila Meiring Fugard, South Africa

G

 Ahmed Gabyow, Somalia
 Gaariye, Somaliland
 Abdul Raheem Glailati, Sudan
 Keith Gottschalk, South Africa
 William Wellington Gqoba, South Africa
 Stephen Gray, South Africa
 Josué Guébo, Ivory Coast
 Mafika Gwala, South Africa

H

 Hadraawi, Somalia
 Malek Haddad, Algeria
 Mohammed Abdullah Hassan, Somalia
 Gebre Hanna, Ethiopia
 Mohammed al-Haik, Morocco
 Allal El Hajjam, Morocco
 Hamdun ibn al-Hajj al-Fasi, Morocco
 Mohammed al-Harraq al-Alami, Morocco
 David Hassine, Morocco
 Sulayman al-Hawwat, Morocco
 Dorian Haarhoff, Namibia
 Helon Habila, Nigeria
 Obo Aba Hisanjani, Nigeria
 Megan Hall, South Africa
 Joan Hambidge, South Africa
 Ernst van Heerden, South Africa
 C. M. van den Heever, South Africa
 Colleen Higgs, South Africa
 Christopher Hope, South Africa
 Peter Horn, South Africa
 Allan Kolski Horwitz, South Africa
 Chenjerai Hove, Zimbabwe

I

 Ismail ibn al-Ahmar, Morocco
 Idriss ibn al-Hassan al-Alami, Morocco
 Ibn al-Khabbaza, Morocco
 Malik ibn al-Murahhal, Morocco
 Ahmad Ibn al-Qadi, Morocco
 Mohammed ibn Qasim ibn Zakur, Morocco
 Ibn Zaydan, Morocco
 Chinweizu Ibekwe, Nigeria
 Abdi Bashir Indhobuur, Somalia
 I. D. du Plessis, South Africa
 Ibrahim 'Ali Salman, Sudan
 Salah Ahmed Ibrahim, Sudan

J

 António Jacinto, Angola
 Abu al-Abbas al-Jarawi, Morocco
 Joseph ben Judah of Ceuta, Morocco
 Ahmed Joumari, Morocco
 John Jea, Nigeria
 Alan James, South Africa
 José Craveirinha, Mozambique
 Noémia de Sousa, Mozambique
 Wopko Jensma, South Africa
 Emmanuel Taiwo Jegede, Nigeria
 Liesl Jobson, South Africa
 Sarah Johnson, South Africa
 Ingrid Jonker, South Africa

K
 Kite Fiqi, Somaliland
 Ajaib Kamal, Kenya
 Jonathan Kariara, Kenya
 Bai T. Moore, Liberia
 Stanley Onjezani Kenani, Malawi
 Mohammed Khammar Kanouni, Morocco
 Mohammed Khaïr-Eddine, Morocco
 Aryan Kaganof, South Africa
 Anne Kellas, South Africa
 Keorapetse Kgositsile, South Africa
 Sheila Khala, Lesotho
 Mbongeni Khumalo, South Africa
 Olga Kirsch, South Africa
 Uys Krige, South Africa
 Antjie Krog, South Africa
 Anton Robert Krueger, South Africa
 Mazisi Kunene, South Africa

 [Ll mbatha ],South Africa 

 Abdellatif Laabi, Morocco 
 Wafaa Lamrani, Morocco
 Ahmed Lemsih, Morocco
 Mandla Langa, South Africa
 Cornelis Jacobus Langenhoven, South Africa
 Pule Lechesa, South Africa
 C. Louis Leipoldt, South Africa
 Douglas Livingstone, South Africa
 Nicolaas Petrus van Wyk Louw, South Africa
 W. E. G. Louw, South Africa
 Taban Lo Liyong, Sudan

M
 Christopher Mwashinga, Tanzania
 Marjorie Oludhe Macgoye, Kenya
 Jack Mapanje, Malawi
 Felix Mnthali, Malawi
 Ahmed al-Madini, Morocco
 Abdelaziz al-Maghrawi, Morocco
 Abderrahman El Majdoub, Morocco
 Abdelaziz al-Malzuzi, Morocco
 Zahra Mansouri, Morocco
 Dambudzo Marechera, Zimbabwe
 Al-Masfiwi, Morocco
 Dada Masiti, Somalia
 Thami Mdaghri, Morocco
 Ahmed Mejjati, Morocco
 Lucien Xavier Michel-Andrianarahinjaka
 Mohammed Bennis, Morocco
 Peya Mushelenga, Namibia
 Mohammed al-Mokhtar Soussi, Morocco
 Rozena Maart, South Africa
 Kim McClenaghan, South Africa
 Michelle McGrane, South Africa
 Don Maclennan, South Africa
 D. F. Malherbe, South Africa
 Clinton Marius, South Africa
 John Mateer, South Africa
 John Matshikiza, South Africa
 James Matthews, South Africa
 Mzwakhe Mbuli, South Africa
 Joan Metelerkamp, South Africa
 Ruth Miller, South Africa
 Amitabh Mitra, South Africa
 Chuma Mmeka, Nigeria
 Kobus Moolman, South Africa
 Rose Moss, South Africa
 Isabella Motadinyane, South Africa
 Modikwe Dikobe, South Africa
 Samuel Edward Krune Mqhayi, South Africa
 Oswald Mbuyiseni Mtshali, South Africa
 Muhammad Ahmad Mahgoub, Sudan
 Malkat Ed-Dar Mohamed, Sudan
 Tumi Molekane, Tanzania
 Mukotani Rugyendo, Uganda
 Micere Githae Mugo, Kenya
 Hassan Sheikh Mumin Somalia
 Mulumba Ivan Matthias, Uganda
 Solomon Mutswairo, Zimbabwe
 Togara Muzanenhamo, Zimbabwe

N

 Mũkoma wa Ngũgĩ, Kenya
 Mririda n’Ait Attik, Morocco
 Mostafa Nissaboury, Morocco
 Hans Daniel Namuhuja, Namibia
 Okey Ndibe, Nigeria
 Uche Nduka, Nigeria
 Echezonachukwu Nduka, Nigeria
 Arthur Nortje, South Africa
 Pitika Ntuli, South Africa

O

 Chike Obi, Nigeria
 Okello Oculi, Uganda
 Tanure Ojaide, Nigeria
 Atukwei Okai, Ghana
 Gabriel Okara, Nigeria
 Diego Odoh Okenyodo, Nigeria
 Christopher Okigbo, Nigeria
 Olatubosun Oladapo, Nigeria
 Onwuchekwa Jemie, Nigeria
 D. J. Opperman, South Africa
 Niyi Osundare, Nigeria

P
 Okot p'Bitek, Uganda
 Nii Ayikwei Parkes, Ghana
 Shailja Patel, Kenya
 Lenrie Peters, Gambia
 William Plomer, South Africa
 Louis-Marie Pouka, Cameroon
 Karen Press, South Africa

Q

 Alfred Themba Qabula, South Africa

R

 David Rubadiri, Malawi
 Lesego Rampolokeng, South Africa
 Francis William Reitz, South Africa
 Rustum Kozain, South Africa
 Gely Abdel Rahman, Sudan
 Ras Nas, Tanzania
 Esther Razanadrasoa (1892–1931), Madagascar
 Shaaban Bin Robert, Tanzania

S

Peter M. Sacks, South Africa
 Abdelhadi Said, Morocco
 Arja Salafranca, South Africa
 Tijan M. Sallah, Gambia
 Dina Salústio, Cabo Verde
 Francisco Santos, Angola
 Mabel Segun, Nigeria
 Jean Sénac, Algeria
 Léopold Sédar Senghor, Senegal
 Sipho Sepamla, South Africa
 Sjaka Septembir, South Africa
 Mohamed Serghini, Morocco
 Mongane Wally Serote, South Africa
 Shaykh Sufi, Somalia
 Warsan Shire, Somalia
 Si Mohand, Algeria
 Ari Sitas, South Africa
 Adam Small, South Africa
 Noémia de Sousa, Mozambique
 Wole Soyinka, Nigeria
 Lina Spies, South Africa
 Bakari Sumano, Mali

T

 Frédéric Pacéré Titinga, Burkina Faso
 Aida Touré, Gabon
 Véronique Tadjo, Côte d'Ivoire
 Abdelkarim Tabbal, Morocco
 Hemmou Talb, Morocco
 Houcine Toulali, Morocco
 Toyin Adewale-Gabriel, Nigeria
 Abdillahi Suldaan Mohammed Timacade, Somalia
 Mohamud Siad Togane, Somalia
 Eugène Terre'Blanche, South Africa
 Totius, South Africa

V

 Mamman Jiya Vatsa, Nigeria
 Benedict Wallet Vilakazi, South Africa
 Wayne Visser, South Africa
 Gert Vlok Nel, South Africa

W
 Patricia Jabbeh Wesley, Liberia
 Phillis Wheatley, Gambia
 Phillis Wheatley, Senegal
 Crystal Warren, South Africa
 Stephen Watson, South Africa
 Mary Morison Webster, South Africa
 George Weideman, South Africa
 Hein Willemse, South Africa
 David Wright, South Africa
 Christopher van Wyk, South Africa
 Chapanga Wilson, Tanzania

X

 Makhosazana Xaba, South Africa
 Cali Xuseen Xirsi, Somalia

Y
 Mvula ya Nangolo, Namibia
 Shadya Yasin, Somalia

Z
 Mohamed Zafzaf, Morocco
 Moufdi Zakaria, Algeria
 Abed Elrahim Abu Zakrra, Sudan
 Musaemura Zimunya, Zimbabwe
 Abdallah Zrika, Morocco

African poets
Poets
poets
African